State Route 218 (SR-218) is a state highway in the U.S. state of Utah. Spanning , it serves as an east/west rural connector, connecting the town of Newton on SR-23 with the city of Smithfield on US-91 in Cache County.

Route description
State Route 218 begins just east of the town of Newton in Cache County. Other than the ends of the route entering towns, the entire route passes through farmland. Beginning as an extension of Main Street (SR-23), it travels southeast about  before turning due east, crossing a northern arm of Cutler Reservoir and passing the town of Amalga. Just after passing Amalga, the route takes a short jog to the southeast and crosses a bridge over the Bear River. From there, the route continues to the east and enters the city of Smithfield on 100 North, where it ends at its intersection with Main Street (US-91).

History

The road from Newton east to Smithfield was first added to the state highway system in 1933 as part of SR-142, which approached the west side of Newton from the south, then turned east to travel through the town and continued east to Smithfield. In 1941, SR-142 was rerouted to exit Newton to the northwest (toward Clarkston), so the former routing along Main Street through Newton was redesignated as SR-218. In 1953, SR-23 was designated, incorporating the southern approach of SR-142 to Newton, SR-218 through the center of Newton, and leaving Newton to the northeast along what was then SR-192.

Save for a minor realignment west of Smithfield to utilize a new bridge over the Bear River built in 1959, the route has remained unchanged since.

Major intersections

References

External links

218
 218